Kustas Köidam (13 April 1879, Lihula Parish (now Lääneranna Parish), Kreis Wiek –  1963) was an Estonian politician. He was a member of I Riigikogu, representing the Estonian Independent Socialist Workers' Party. He was a member of the Riigikogu since 15 December 1920. He replaced Martin Bleimann. On 25 April 1922, he resigned his position and he was replaced by August Putk.

References

1879 births
1963 deaths
People from Lääneranna Parish
People from Kreis Wiek
Estonian Independent Socialist Workers' Party politicians
Members of the Riigikogu, 1920–1923